A bassaris (βασσαρίς) is an ancient type of clothing.  Bassaris is the Greek word for a fox skin. The Greek god Dionysus was associated with the bassaris, and his followers (the Maenads) were said to wear it. As a result, they were known as the "Bassarids." Dionysus was said to have worn the bassaris, although this detail was only to be found in Thrace.

See also
 Skinning

References

Foxes in literature
Dionysus in mythology